Bengkalis Regency is a regency of Indonesia in the Riau province. The regency, which includes the whole of Bengkalis and Rupat Islands in the Strait of Malacca, has been established since 1956. The regency was formerly divided into 13 districts (or kecamatan); however five of these districts were removed to create the new Meranti Islands Regency, leaving eight districts in the Bengkalis Regency, which number has increased since 2010 to eleven by splitting of existing districts on the Sumatran mainland. 
Bengkalis Regency produces natural resources, particularly petroleum, rubber, and coconut.  The regency is home to the Bukit Batu Biosphere Reserve.

Geography

Bengkalis Regency comprises the whole of Bengkalis Island and Rupat Island which are located in the Straits of Malacca, together with a wide swathe of the eastern coastal area of Sumatra Island as well as other islands within the archipelago to its north-east. The land area covers 8,426.48 km2 and it borders on the Malacca Straits to the North, on Siak Regency to the south, on the Meranti Islands Regency to the Southeast, and on Dumai municipality, Rokan Hilir Regency and Rokan Hulu Regency to the West.

The Bengkalis Strait separates Bengkalis Island from Sumatra as well as from Padang Island and Tebing Tinggi Island.

Population
Following the splitting of the regency to create a new Meranti Islands Regency, the residual area of Bengkalis Regency had a population of 498,336 at the 2010 census and 565,569 at the 2020 census.

Administrative districts 

The eleven districts (kecamatan) currently forming the regency are listed below with their areas and their populations at the 2010 and 2020 censuses: The table also includes the locations of the district administrative centres, and the number of villages (rural desa and urban kelurahan) in each district.

Notes: (a) the 2010 populations of the new Bathin Solapan and Talang Muandau Districts are included in the figures for Mandau and Pinggir Districts, from which they were cut out. (b) the 2010 population of the new Bandar Laksamana District is included in the figure for Bukit Batu District, from which it was cut out.
Bengkalis Island comprises Bengkalis and Bantan districts, while Rupat Island comprises Rupat and Rupat Utara (North Rupat) districts. The remaining seven districts lie on Sumatra Island.

References

Regencies of Riau
Riau Archipelago